Human Torch, in comics, may refer to:

 Human Torch (android), the original Timely Comics character
 Human Torch, Marvel Comics' member of the Fantastic Four